Marzian or Morzian may refer to:
 Morzian, Fars
 Marzian, Lorestan